Jamie McLeod-Skinner (born May 31, 1967) is an American attorney, engineer, and politician who was the Democratic nominee for  in the 2022 election. In an upset, McLeod-Skinner defeated seven-term incumbent Blue Dog representative Kurt Schrader in the Democratic primary for Oregon's 5th, in a race in which she was considered the more progressive candidate. She later lost the general election to Republican former Happy Valley mayor Lori Chavez-DeRemer.

Early life and education
McLeod-Skinner was born in Milwaukee, Wisconsin. When she was nine, her mother, Marty Hall, moved to teach school in Tanzania. She attended elementary and high school there and in Kenya. She moved in 1983 to Ashland, Oregon. She holds the girls' 800-meter track record at Ashland High School from which she graduated in 1985. She went to college at Rensselaer Polytechnic Institute, graduating in 1989 with a Bachelor of Science. She received a master's degree in engineering from Cornell University in 1995. She graduated from the University of Oregon School of Law in 2016 with a Juris Doctor.

Career
Beginning at the end of 1995 she served as a reconstruction and program manager in war-torn Bosnia and Kosovo. She led a Lutheran services organization from 2000 through 2002.

From 2016 to 2017, McLeod-Skinner was the city manager of Phoenix, Oregon, where she was fired after four months because of complaints from several department heads. She became the interim city manager of Talent, Oregon, in 2020, hired after a forest fire that destroyed over 700 homes, more than one-third of the city, and where there was substantial discord between the executive, administration, and city employees.

Political career 
She served on the city council of Santa Clara, California, for eight years from 2004 to 2012. In 2018, she ran in the  Democratic primary for Oregon's 2nd congressional district, winning by 19.5% in a seven-candidate field. The district had been held by Republicans since 1981 and had only twice been represented by Democrats in its 121-year history. In the general election, she faced nine-term incumbent Greg Walden, a former state senator. She decided to run due to Walden's efforts to replace the Affordable Care Act. No Democrat had come within 36 percentage points of Walden since 2000. McLeod-Skinner lost by less than 17%. A political scientist took note of her run, as she had defeated Walden in rural Deschutes County though no candidate had come close before, with Carol Voisin outdoing all others, yet losing by almost 17,000 votes in 2006.

In 2020, she ran in the Secretary of State primary against two incumbent Democratic state senators, Shemia Fagan and Mark Hass. She focused her campaign on preserving and expanding voter rights and accessibility and did not accept corporate contributions. In the Democratic primary, the three candidates were separated by less than nine percentage points, with Fagan winning the election.

In 2022, McLeod-Skinner challenged centrist Democrat Kurt Schrader, a six-term incumbent whose district boundaries were substantially reordered by redistricting as Oregon gained a sixth seat due to its population increase. Schrader had opposed initiatives by President Biden, who nevertheless endorsed him, but the incumbent had alienated grassroots leadership in a number of counties. The new district took in Deschutes County and also included part of Multnomah County, a reliable progressive stronghold. She won both counties by double digits. Democratic Party leadership organizations in four of the five counties within the district's new boundaries supported McLeod-Skinner, who was also endorsed by Senator Elizabeth Warren. Schrader received 2022 endorsements from President Joe Biden and House Speaker Nancy Pelosi, and his campaign outspent McLeod-Skinner's by 10–1. Although he first referred to Trump's impeachment as a "lynching", he later voted for it. McLeod-Skinner's win marked the first time an incumbent member of Oregon's congressional delegation had lost a primary in 42 years.

Electoral history

2018

2020

2022

References

External links 

 Jamie McLeod-Skinner for Congress campaign website

1967 births
21st-century American politicians
21st-century American women lawyers
21st-century American lawyers
21st-century American women politicians
American city managers
American expatriates in Kenya
American expatriates in Tanzania
California city council members
Candidates in the 2022 United States House of Representatives elections
Cornell University College of Engineering alumni
Living people
People from Bend, Oregon
People from Santa Clara, California
Politicians from Milwaukee
Oregon Democrats
Rensselaer Polytechnic Institute alumni
Women city councillors in California
Women in Oregon politics
University of Oregon School of Law alumni
LGBT people from Oregon